Chaca may refer to:

Animals
 The catfish genus Chaca

Places

Spain
 An alternative spelling of the town Jaca, Spain

Literature
 A character in The Emperor's New School

People
 Kristian Menchaca, an American soldier who was killed in the Iraq War